Vallance is a surname, and may refer to:

 Elizabeth Vallance (1945–2020), British philosopher, magistrate and policy maker
 Gerald Aylmer Vallance (1892–1955), born George Alexander Gerald Vallance, was a Scottish newspaper editor
 Iain Vallance, Baron Vallance of Tummel (born 1943) Scottish businessman
 Jeffrey Vallance (born 1955), American artist
 Jim Vallance (born 1952), Canadian songwriter
 Sir Patrick Vallance (born 1960), British doctor and Chief Scientific Adviser to the Government of the United Kingdom
 Louise Vallance (born 1958), Canadian actress and singer
 Thomas Vallance (1924–1980), English football player
 Thomas George Vallance (1928–1993), Australian geologist and historian of science
 Tom Vallance (1856–1935), Scottish international football player
 William Fleming Vallance (1827–1904), Scottish artist

Groups

Vallance F. C., a football club in Bethnal Green, London

See also
Valance (disambiguation)
Valence (disambiguation)